Kahweol is a diterpenoid molecule found in the beans of Coffea arabica and is structurally related to cafestol. Its name derives from the Arabic   meaning "coffee".

See also 
 Cafestol

References 

Diterpenes
Naphthofurans
Vicinal diols
Cyclopentanes